For the First Time  is the second album by Stephanie Mills. Released in 1975 on the Motown label. Produced by  Burt Bacharach and Hal David; directed by Phil Ramone. The arrangements were by Burt Bacharach, Bill Eaton, Dave Matthews and Kenny Asher.  After a fallout during the recording of the soundtrack to the remake of Lost Horizon, Bacharach and David split before briefly reuniting for this album.  After this album project that featured eight new songs plus two covers of songs that Dionne Warwick had previously recorded, the famous songwriting duo would not work together until they wrote three unrecorded songs in 1978. They then did not write together again until a reunion in 1989, when they wrote two songs - "How Can I Love You" which remains unrecorded, and "Sunny Weather Lover" which was eventually recorded by Dionne Warwick for her 1993 album Friends Can Be Lovers.

Track listing
All songs written by Burt Bacharach and Hal David
"I Took My Strength from You" 3:50	
"Living on Plastic" 2:48
"No One Remembers My Name" 3:22 		
"If You Can Learn How to Cry" 3:23	
"Loneliness Remembers (What Happiness Forgets)" 2:30		
"This Empty Place" 3:10
"The Way I Feel About You" 3:05 		
"I See You for the First Time" 3:06		
"All the Way to Paradise" 3:19	
"Please Let Go" 3:49

Production
All songs arranged by Burt Bacharach, except track  4 (Bill Eaton), 5 (Dave Matthews), and 6 & 8 (Kenny Asher).
Produced by Burt Bacharach and Hal David

References

External links
 Stephanie Mills-For The First Time  at Discogs

1975 albums
Stephanie Mills albums
Albums arranged by David Matthews (keyboardist)
Albums arranged by Burt Bacharach
Albums produced by Burt Bacharach
Motown albums